The Love of Lionel's Life is an Australian film for television.

It was also known as Open Life.

Cast
Matt Day
Alex Dimitriades
Nadine Garner
Steven Vidler
Graeme Blundell
Carol Burns
Heather Mitchell
Chris Betts
Paul Denny
Catherine Miller
Chris Anderson
Jean-Marc Russ

Production
The film was partly financed by the Film Finance Corporation and screened on Channel Ten.

References

External links

The Love of Lionel's Life at BFI

Australian television films
2000 television films
2000 films
2000s English-language films